Symphyotrichum urophyllum (formerly Aster urophyllus) is a species of flowering plant in the family Asteraceae native to eastern North America, commonly known as arrowleaf aster.

Description

Plants are cespitose, with 1–5 erect stems emerging from the same point. The broad, thin, toothed leaves are arrow-shaped, with a broadly winged petiole. The dense, pyramidal inflorescence of composite flowers is distinctive. The ray florets are white and the disc florets are white to cream becoming pink.

Taxonomy
Symphyotrichum urophyllum was formerly included in the large genus Aster as Aster urophyllus. However, this broad circumscription of Aster is polyphyletic and the North American asters are now mostly classified in Symphyotrichum and several other genera.

The taxonomic status of this species has been unstable, and it has been treated as Symphyotrichum sagittifolium, a name now considered to be synonymous with Symphyotrichum cordifolium. Most sources now use S. urophyllum to refer to this species.

Distribution and habitat

Symphyotrichum urophyllum is native to the United States from Maine to Florida and west to Nebraska, as well as Ontario, Canada. It is found in open, dry to mesic habitats such as meadows, open woodlands, bluffs, forest edges, and roadsides.

Citations

References

urophyllum
Flora of Ontario
Flora of the United States
Plants described in 1836
Taxa named by John Lindley